NewsPunch is a Los Angeles-based fake news website. Originally named Your News Wire, it was founded in 2014 by Sean Adl-Tabatabai and his husband Sinclair Treadway. In November 2018, it rebranded itself as NewsPunch. Your News Wire was revived as a separate website in November 2020, and has continued publishing hoaxes similar to those in NewsPunch.

A 2017 BuzzFeed report identified NewsPunch as being the second-largest source of popular fake stories spread on Facebook that year, and a June 2018 Poynter analysis identified NewsPunch as being debunked over 80 times in 2017 and 2018 by Poynter-accredited factcheckers such as Snopes, FactCheck.org, PolitiFact, and the Associated Press.

The European Union's East StratCom Task Force has criticized NewsPunch for spreading Russian propaganda, a charge Adl-Tabatabai denies.

Regular contributors to NewsPunch include Adl-Tabatabai, a former BBC and MTV employee from London previously an employee of conspiracy theorist David Icke, Adl-Tabatabai's mother Carol Adl, an alternative health practitioner, and Baxter Dmitry, who had previously been posing as an unrelated Latvian man using a stolen profile photo.

Fake news stories 
NewsPunch has published false stories, including:

 Stories pushing the debunked Pizzagate conspiracy theory. NewsPunch was one of the first sites to propagate the conspiracy theory, publishing a falsified story that was later used as a basis for Pizzagate's viral spread among the alt-right.
 Claims that the 2017 Las Vegas shootings and Manchester Arena bombings were false flags.
 Anti-vaccination hoaxes alleging that Bill Gates refused to vaccinate his children and "admitted that vaccinations are designed so that governments can depopulate the world".
 Claims that Hillary Clinton's popular vote victory in the 2016 United States Presidential election was the result of voter fraud.
 Allegations that Clinton was responsible for Anthony Bourdain's suicide, invoking the conspiracy theory that the Clintons had murdered people.
 False claims that Justin Trudeau was the love child of Fidel Castro.

See also 
 List of fake news websites
 Fake news websites in the United States

References 

Fake news websites
American news websites
Conspiracist media
American political websites
Mass media in Los Angeles